Madeleine's Ghost is a first mystery novel by Robert Girardi.

Publishing history
An editor for Delacorte Press found the manuscript for Madeleine's Ghost on a friend's coffee table and fell in love with the story.

References

1995 American novels
American mystery novels
1995 debut novels